Abhay Singh (born 3 September 1998) is an Indian professional squash player. As of January 2019, he was ranked number 103 in the world. As of March 2022, he has competed in 45 tournaments of the professional squash world tour. At the South Asian Games held in Nepal in 2019, Singh won a silver medal in the team event and a bronze medal in the individual event. He is a former India and Asia number 1 in the Boys U19 category and has reached the quarter-finals in the World Championship. He has also competed in the British Premier Squash League.

References

1998 births
Living people
Racket sportspeople from Chennai
Indian male squash players
South Asian Games silver medalists for India
South Asian Games bronze medalists for India
South Asian Games medalists in squash
Squash players at the 2022 Commonwealth Games
Commonwealth Games competitors for India